Shoulder problems including pain, are  one of the more common reasons for physician visits for musculoskeletal symptoms. The shoulder is the most movable joint in the body.  However, it is an unstable joint because of the range of motion allowed. This instability increases the likelihood of joint injury, often leading to a degenerative process in which tissues break down and no longer function well.

Shoulder pain may be localized or may be referred to areas around the shoulder or down the arm. Other regions within the body (such as gallbladder, liver, or heart disease, or disease of the cervical spine of the neck) also may generate pain that the brain may interpret as arising from the shoulder.

Shoulder structures and functions
The shoulder joint is composed of three bones: the clavicle (collarbone), the scapula (shoulder blade), and the humerus (upper arm bone) (see diagram). Two joints facilitate shoulder movement. The acromioclavicular (AC) joint is located between the acromion (part of the scapula that forms the highest point of the shoulder) and the clavicle. The glenohumeral joint, to which the term "shoulder joint" commonly refers, is a ball-and-socket joint that allows the arm to rotate in a circular fashion or to hinge out and up away from the body. The "ball" is the top, rounded portion of the upper arm bone or humerus; the "socket," or glenoid, is a dish-shaped part of the outer edge of the scapula into which the ball fits.  Arm movement is further facilitated by the ability of the scapula itself to slide along the rib cage.  The capsule is a soft tissue envelope that encircles the glenohumeral joint. It is lined by a thin, smooth synovial membrane.

The bones of the shoulder are held in place by muscles, tendons, and ligaments. Tendons are tough cords of tissue that attach the shoulder muscles to bone and assist the muscles in moving the shoulder. Ligaments attach shoulder bones to each other, providing stability. For example, the front of the joint capsule is anchored by three glenohumeral ligaments.

The rotator cuff is a structure composed of tendons that, with associated muscles, holds the ball at the top of the humerus in the glenoid socket and provides mobility and strength to the shoulder joint.

Four filmy sac-like structures called bursa permit smooth gliding between bone, muscle, and tendon. They cushion and protect the rotator cuff from the bony arch of the acromion.

Diagnosis
Following are some of the ways doctors diagnose shoulder problems:

Medical history and physical exam
 Medical history (the patient tells the doctor about an injury). For shoulder problems the medical history includes the patient's age, dominant hand, if injury affects normal work/activities as well as details on the actual shoulder problem including acute versus chronic and the presence of shoulder catching, instability, locking, pain, paresthesias (burning sensation), stiffness, swelling, and weakness. Other salutary information includes OPQRST (onset, palliation/provocation, quality, radiation, severity, timing) and a history of issues that could lead to referred pain (pain felt at the shoulder but actually coming from another part of the body) including cervical spine disorders, heart attacks, peptic ulcer disease, and pneumonia. Standardized questionnaires like the Penn Shoulder Score that assess shoulder pain and function can aid in eliciting the required history to make a diagnosis and monitor condition progression.
 Physical examination of the shoulder to feel for injury and discover the limits of movement, location of pain, and extent of joint instability. The steps to elicit this information are inspection (looking), palpation (feeling), testing range of motion, and performing special maneuvers. Information collected on inspection are asymmetry, atrophy, ecchymosis, scars, swelling, and venous distention. Palpation can help find pain and deformities, and should specifically include the anterior glenohumeral joint, acromioclavicular joint, biceps tendon, cervical spine, coracoid process, scapula, and sternoclavicular joint. Range of motion tests external and internal rotation, abduction and adduction, passive and active weakness, and true weakness versus weakness due to pain. The Apley scratch test is the most useful: touch opposite scapular by reaching behind the head for adduction and external rotation and behind the back for abduction and internal rotation. Finally, there are more specific maneuvers that can home in on a diagnosis, however their accuracy is limited.

Diagnostic tests
 Tests to confirm the diagnosis of certain conditions. Some of these tests include:
 X-ray
 Arthrogram—Diagnostic record that can be seen on an X-ray after injection of a contrast fluid into the shoulder joint to outline structures such as the rotator cuff. In disease or injury, this contrast fluid may either leak into an area where it does not belong, indicating a tear or opening, or be blocked from entering an area where there normally is an opening.
 MRI (magnetic resonance imaging)--A non-invasive procedure in which a machine produces a series of cross-sectional images of the shoulder.
 Other diagnostic tests, such as injection of an anesthetic into and around the shoulder joint.

Dislocation

Description
The shoulder joint is the most frequently dislocated major joint of the body. In a typical case of a dislocated shoulder, a strong force that pulls the shoulder outward (abduction) or extreme rotation of the joint pops the ball of the humerus out of the shoulder socket. Dislocation commonly occurs when there is a backward pull on the arm that either catches the muscles unprepared to resist or overwhelms the muscles. When a shoulder dislocates frequently, the condition is referred to as shoulder instability. A partial dislocation where the upper arm bone is partially in and partially out of the socket is called a subluxation. In the medical community, dislocation is commonly referred to as luxation.

Signs and diagnosis
Almost all shoulder dislocations are downwards (inferior) and of these, 95 percent are in a forward direction. Clinically this is referred to as an anterior dislocation of the glenohumeral joint. Not only does the arm appear out of position when the shoulder dislocates, but the dislocation also produces pain. Muscle spasms may increase the intensity of pain. Swelling and bruising normally develop, and in some cases there may be numbness and muscle weakness. Problems seen with a dislocated shoulder are tearing of the ligaments or tendons reinforcing the joint capsule and, less commonly, nerve damage. Doctors usually diagnose a dislocation by a physical examination, but X-rays are taken to confirm the diagnosis and to rule out a related fracture and other complications. X-rays are also taken after relocation to ensure it is in the correct place.

Treatment
Doctors treat a dislocation by putting the head of the humerus back into the joint socket (glenoid fossa) of the scapula—a procedure called manipulation and reduction. This is usually followed up with an X-ray to make sure the reduction did not fracture the surrounding bones. The arm is then immobilized in a sling or a device called a shoulder immobilizer for several days. Usually the doctor recommends resting the shoulder and applying ice three or four times a day. After pain and swelling have been controlled, the patient enters a rehabilitation program that includes exercises to restore the range of motion of the shoulder and strengthen the muscles to prevent future dislocations. These exercises may progress from simple motion to the use of weights.

After treatment and recovery, a previously dislocated shoulder may remain more susceptible to reinjury, especially in young, active individuals. Ligaments are stretched and may tear due to dislocation. Torn ligaments and other problems resulting from dislocation can increase the chance of repeated dislocation.  A shoulder that dislocates severely or often, injuring surrounding tissues or nerves, usually requires surgery to repair the damaged parts of the shoulder.

Sometimes the doctor performs surgery through a tiny incision into which a small scope (arthroscope) is inserted to observe the inside of the joint. After this procedure, called arthroscopic surgery, the shoulder is generally restrained by a sling for three to six weeks, while full recovery, including physical therapy, takes several months. Arthroscopic techniques involving the shoulder are relatively new and many surgeons prefer to repair a recurrent dislocating shoulder by the time-tested open surgery under direct vision. There are usually fewer repeat dislocations and improved movement following open surgery, but it may take a little longer to regain motion.

Separation

Description
A shoulder separation occurs where the collarbone (clavicle) meets the shoulder blade (scapula). When ligaments that hold the AC (acromioclavicular) joint together are partially or completely torn, the outer end of the clavicle may slip out of place, preventing it from properly meeting the scapula. Most often the injury is caused by a blow to the shoulder or by falling on an outstretched hand. After injury it is hard to do a 180 degrees rotation.

Signs and diagnosis
Shoulder pain or tenderness and, occasionally, a bump in the middle of the top of the shoulder (over the AC joint) are signs that a separation may have occurred. Sometimes the severity of a separation can be detected by taking X-rays while the patient holds a light weight that pulls on the muscles, making a separation more pronounced.

Treatment
A shoulder separation is usually treated conservatively by rest and wearing a sling. Soon after injury, an ice bag may be applied to relieve pain and swelling. After a period of rest, a therapist helps the patient perform exercises that put the shoulder through its range of motion. Most shoulder separations heal within two or three months without further intervention. However, if ligaments are severely torn, surgical repair may be required to hold the clavicle in place. A doctor may wait to see if conservative treatment works before deciding whether surgery is required.

Sternoclavicular separation

Description

While not directly a shoulder problem, this may affect shoulder functionality due to problems with sternoclavicular rotation.  A sternoclavicular separation occurs when the sternum separates from the clavicle at the sternoclavicular joint.  Sternoclavicular separations (dislocation and subluxation) are rare and generally caused by accident.  If the clavicle is separated posteriorly (i.e. the clavicle separates and goes behind the sternum) the situation can be dangerous and the clavicle can cause damage to interior arteries, veins or organs.

Signs and diagnosis
An X-ray or CT Scan may be necessary to accurately diagnose a sternoclavicular separation.

Treatment
Treatment consists of the standard use of plenty of rest, icing, NSAIDs and a sling.  The joint may need to be reduced (i.e. put back in place), especially after posterior separations.  In severe cases, surgery may be advised.

Rotator Cuff Tendinopathy (Tendinitis, bursitis, impingement syndrome, and rotator cuff tears)

Anatomy 
The "rotator cuff" is a group of four tendons that blend together as they attach to the upper end of the arm bone (humerus). These tendons transmit the force of muscles originating on the shoulder blade (scapula) to the arm providing rotational motion and centering or stability of the joint.

Pathology 
The rotator cuff tendons degenerate with age. A group of respected scientists wrote in a review of existing evidence that, the theory that this degeneration is related to pinching (or impingement) between the head of the humerus and the acromion is now considered inaccurate. Rotator cuff pathology is similar in non-dominant compared to dominant and symptomatic compared to asymptomatic shoulder. About two-thirds of all humans develop rotator cuff tendinopathy if they live to 70 years of age. The pathology is mucoid degeneration, not inflammation. The process can involve the intra-articular part of the long head of biceps in addition to the supraspinatus, infraspinatus, and subscapularis tendons. 

Tendinitis is inflammation (redness, soreness, and swelling) of a tendon. In tendinitis of the shoulder, the rotator cuff and/or biceps tendon become inflamed, usually as a result of being pinched by surrounding structures. The injury may vary from mild inflammation to involvement of most of the rotator cuff. When the rotator cuff tendon becomes inflamed and thickened, it may get trapped under the acromion. Squeezing of the rotator cuff is called impingement syndrome.

An inflamed bursa is called bursitis. Tendinitis and impingement syndrome are often accompanied by inflammation of the bursa sacs that protect the shoulder. Inflammation caused by a disease such as rheumatoid arthritis may cause rotator cuff tendinitis and bursitis. Sports involving overuse of the shoulder and occupations requiring frequent overhead reaching are other potential causes of irritation to the rotator cuff or bursa and may lead to inflammation and impingement.

Rotator cuff tear 

The most commonly affected tendon is that of the supraspinatus muscle.
Defects in the rotator cuff can come from an injury (cuff tear) or from degeneration (cuff wear).
The degree to which a tendon is reparable depends on its quantity and quality. Degenerated tendons are often frail and retracted and may not be amenable to repair. Individuals that are elderly, smokers, or those having had cortisone injections often have weaker tendon tissue that fails without a significant injury. By contrast those whose tendon was torn by a substantial fall often have good quality tendon that can be repaired if surgery is performed promptly after the injury.
The symptoms of rotator cuff disease include difficulty lifting the arm.
Repair of a rotator cuff requires that the tendon be securely anchored to the bone at surgery and that the repair be protected for several months during healing.

Signs
Signs of these conditions include the slow onset of discomfort and pain in the upper shoulder or upper third of the arm and/or difficulty sleeping on the shoulder, similar condition can have sharp pain or discomfort when the upper shoulder is positioned at certain angles. Tendinitis and bursitis also cause pain when the arm is lifted away from the body or overhead. If tendinitis involves the biceps tendon (the tendon located in front of the shoulder that helps bend the elbow and turn the forearm), pain will occur in the front or side of the shoulder and may travel down to the elbow and forearm. Pain may also occur when the arm is forcefully pushed upward overhead.

Diagnosis
Diagnosis of tendinitis and bursitis begins with a medical history and physical examination. X-rays do not show tendons or the bursae but may be helpful in ruling out bony abnormalities or arthritis. The doctor may remove and test fluid from the inflamed area to rule out infection.
Ultrasound scans are frequently used to confirm a suspected tendinitis or bursitis as well as rule out a tear in the rotator cuff muscles.
Impingement syndrome may be confirmed when injection of a small amount of anesthetic (lidocaine hydrochloride) into the space under the acromion relieves pain.

Treatment
Anti-inflammatory medicines such as aspirin, naproxen or ibuprofen among others can be taken to help with pain. In some cases the physical therapist will use ultrasound and electrical stimulation, as well as manipulation. Gentle stretching and strengthening exercises are added gradually. If there is no improvement, the doctor may inject a corticosteroid medicine into the space under the acromion. However, recent level one evidence showed limited efficacy of corticosteroid injections for pain relief. While steroid injections are a common treatment, they must be used with caution because they may lead to tendon rupture. If there is still no improvement after six to 12 months, the doctor may perform either arthroscopic or open surgery to repair damage and relieve pressure on the tendons and bursae.

In those with calcific tendinitis of the shoulder high energy extracorporeal shock-wave therapy can be useful. It is not useful in other types of tendonitis.For a rotator cuff tear, tentative evidence suggests exercise may reduce pain in the short-term. Combination of exercise and joint mobilization can result in long term benefits. Other evidence demonstrates the use of corticosteroids injections to be more effective.

SLAP tear (lesion)

A SLAP (superior labrum anterior to posterior) tear occurs when the cartilage of the shoulder (labrum) delaminates from glenoid. This causes an instability of the shoulder, typically in overhead movements.

Symptoms

Symptoms include a dull ache deep in the shoulder joint, trouble sleeping due to the instability and discomfort, and extreme weakness in overhead activities.

Diagnosis

The best diagnosis for a SLAP tear is a clinical exam
followed by an MRI combined with a contrast agent.

Treatment

Very few cases recover to complete mobility without surgical intervention. Some patients are able to strengthen their shoulders to limit the day to day dull ache, but with limited mobility and function. Surgery reattaches the labrum to the glenoid through the use of surgical anchors.

Recovery

Recovery is often a lengthy process. The first four or so weeks the patient is required to wear a sling. Following this, there is a month of physical therapy to regain range of motion. At two months limited strength training occurs. At six months the patient is typically released to full active use, although many patients find that full recovery takes longer than this.

Frozen shoulder (adhesive capsulitis)

As the name implies, movement of the shoulder is severely restricted in people with a "frozen shoulder". This condition, which doctors call adhesive capsulitis, is frequently caused by injury that leads to lack of use due to pain. Rheumatic disease progression and recent shoulder surgery can also cause frozen shoulder. Intermittent periods of use may cause inflammation. Adhesions (abnormal bands of tissue) grow between the joint surfaces, restricting motion. There is also a lack of synovial fluid, which normally lubricates the gap between the arm bone and socket to help the shoulder joint move. It is this restricted space between the capsule and ball of the humerus that distinguishes adhesive capsulitis from a less complicated painful, stiff shoulder. People with diabetes, stroke, lung disease, rheumatoid arthritis, and heart disease, or who have been in an accident, are at a higher risk for frozen shoulder. The condition rarely appears in people under the age of 40.

Fracture

Description
A bone fracture of the shoulder involves a partial or total crack through one of the three bones in the shoulder, the clavicle, the scapula, and the humerus. The break in a bone usually occurs as a result of an impact injury, such as a fall or blow to the shoulder. Fractures usually involve the clavicle or the neck (area below the ball) of the humerus. Fractures of the scapula sometimes occur through the coracoid process.

Signs and diagnosis
A shoulder fracture that occurs after a major injury is usually accompanied by severe pain. Within a short time, there may be redness and bruising around the area. Sometimes a fracture is obvious because the bones appear out of position.
(However this occur in non-involved dislocations and separations.) Both diagnosis and severity can be confirmed by X-rays.

Treatment
When a fracture occurs, the doctor tries to bring the bones into a position that will promote healing and restore arm movement. If the clavicle is fractured, the patient must at first wear a strap and sling around the chest to keep the clavicle in place. After removing the strap and sling, the doctor will prescribe exercises to strengthen the shoulder and restore movement. Surgery is occasionally needed for certain clavicle fractures, especially for disunions.

Fracture of the neck of the humerus is usually treated with a sling or shoulder immobilizer. If the bones are out of position, surgery may be necessary to reset them. Exercises are also part of restoring shoulder strength and motion.

Arthritis of the shoulder (glenohumeral joint)

Description
In arthritis of the shoulder, the cartilage of the ball and socket (glenohumeral joint) is lost so that bone rubs on bone.
It may be caused by wear and tear (degenerative joint disease), injury (traumatic arthritis), surgery (secondary degenerative joint disease), inflammation (rheumatoid arthritis) or infection (septic arthritis).

Signs and diagnosis

Arthritis of the shoulder causes pain and loss of motion and use of the shoulder. X-rays of the shoulder show loss of the normal space between the ball and socket. X-ray can provide radiographic staging of shoulder osteoarthritis.

Treatment
Early on arthritis of the shoulder can be managed with mild analgesics and gentle exercises. Known gentle exercises include warm water therapy pool exercises that are provided by a trained and licensed physical therapist; approved land exercises to assure free movement of the arthritic area; cortisone injections (administered at the minimum of every six months according to orthopedic physicians) to reduce inflammation; ice and hot moist pact application are very effective. Moist heat is preferred over ice whereas ice is preferred if inflammation occurs during the daytime hours.  Local analgesics along with ice or moist heat are adequate treatments for acute pain.

In the case of rheumatoid arthritis, specific medications selected by a rheumatologist may offer substantial relief.

When exercise and medication are no longer effective, shoulder replacement surgery for arthritis may be considered.  In this operation, a surgeon replaces the shoulder joint with an artificial ball for the top of the humerus and a cap (glenoid) for the scapula. Passive shoulder exercises (where someone else moves the arm to rotate the shoulder joint) are started soon after surgery. Patients begin exercising on their own about three to six weeks after surgery. Eventually, stretching and strengthening exercises become a major part of the rehabilitation programme. The success of the operation often depends on the condition of rotator cuff muscles prior to surgery and the degree to which the patient follows the exercise programme.

In young and active patients a partial shoulder replacement with a non-prosthetic glenoid arthroplasty may also be a consideration

Arthritis or osteolysis of the AC (acromioclavicular) joint

Description
The acromioclavicular articulation consists of the acromioclavicular ligament and a small disk of cartilage located in between the acromion and the clavicle.  This disk can wear down through injury, extreme joint stress (via bodybuilding) or normal wear.

Signs and diagnosis
Pain is perceived on shoulder motion, especially on certain movements.  Often a crossover arm test is utilized in diagnosis because this compresses the AC joint, exacerbating the symptoms.  X-rays of the shoulder joint may show either arthritic changes of the ac joint or osteolysis.

Treatment
Conservative treatment for this joint is similar to treatments for other types of arthritis, including restricting activity, anti-inflammatory medications (or supplements), physical therapy, and occasionally cortisone shots.  If the pain is severe, surgery may be an option.  The most common surgical treatment, known as resection arthroplasty, involves cutting a very small portion off the clavicle end and letting scar tissue fill in its place. Some portions of the acromioclavicular ligament may still remain attached.

Treatment
A mnemonic for the basic treatment principles of any musculoskeletal problems is PRICE: Protection, Rest, Ice, Compression, and Elevation:
 Protection: Guard the shoulder to prevent further injury.
 Rest: Reduce or stop using the injured area for 48 hours.
 Ice: Put an ice pack on the injured area for 20 minutes at a time, 4 to 8 times per day. Use a cold pack, ice bag, or a plastic bag filled with crushed ice that has been wrapped in a towel.
 Compression: Compress the area with bandages, such as an elastic wrap, to help stabilize the shoulder.
 Elevation: Keep the injured area elevated above the level of the heart. Use a pillow to help elevate the injury.

If pain and stiffness persist, see a doctor.

According to the American Academy of Orthopaedic Surgeons (AAOS) visits to orthopedic specialists  for shoulder pain has been rising since 1998 and in 2005 over 13 million patients sought medical care for shoulder pain, of which only 34 percent were related to injury.

References 

This article contains and extends text from the public domain document "Questions and Answers about Shoulder Problems", NIH Publication No. 01-4865, available from URL http://www.niams.nih.gov/hi/topics/shoulderprobs/shoulderqa.htm

External links 

Injuries of shoulder and upper arm
Musculoskeletal disorders
Overuse injuries
Shoulder
Orthopedic problems
Medical mnemonics